Adriana Giuffrè (born 9 March 1939) is an Italian actress. She appeared in more than fifty films since 1961.

Filmography

References

External links 

1939 births
Living people
Italian film actresses
People of Calabrian descent